The Complete John Peel Sessions is a CD collection of the radio sessions recorded by English musician Gary Numan for the Radio One DJ John Peel.

It was released in 2007 on the newly formed Maida Vale Records and received generally favourable reviews. It also marked the first time the Pure session had been made commercially available.

The eight-page booklet contains an extensive July 2006 essay by Joel McIver

Track listing 
 "Me! I Disconnect From You" – 3:10
 "Down in the Park" – 4:20
 "I Nearly Married a Human" – 6:39
 "Cars" – 3:17
 "Airlane" – 3:26
 "Films" – 2:52
 "Conversation" – 6:52
 "Rip" – 5:04
 "Metal" – 4:02
 "Pure" – 5:09
 "My Jesus" – 5:44
 "Cars" – 4:11
 "Listen to My Voice" – 5:18
 "I Can't Breathe" – 5:45
 "Down in the Park" – 5:15
 "A Prayer for the Unborn" – 6:00

  Tracks 1–3 recorded 10 January 1979 and transmitted 16 January 1979.
  Tracks 4–7 recorded 29 May 1979 and transmitted 25 June 1979.
  Tracks 8–16 recorded and transmitted 7 February 2001.

Personnel (tracks 1–3) 
Gary Numan – vocals, keyboards, guitar

Paul Gardiner – bass

Jess Lidyard – drums

Personnel (tracks 4–7) 
Gary Numan – vocals

Chris Payne – keyboards

Billy Currie – keyboards

Paul Gardiner – bass

Cedric Sharpley – drums

Personnel (tracks 8–16) 
Gary Numan – vocals

Steve Harris – guitar

Richard Beasley – drums

David Brooks – bass, keyboards

Ade Orange – keyboards

References 

2007 live albums
2007 compilation albums
Peel Sessions recordings
Gary Numan compilation albums
Gary Numan live albums
Albums produced by Bob Sargeant